Hollington K Tong; 9 November 1887 – 9 January 1971) was a Chinese journalist and diplomat.

Tong was from a poor Chinese Christian family. He graduated in journalism from the University of Missouri, and from the first class of the Columbia University Graduate School of Journalism in 1913. Upon returning to China, he worked as a journalist and later became the chief editor of a large English-language newspaper in Shanghai. He also was the official biographer of Chiang Kai-shek.

Tong was appointed Vice-Minister of Information of the Republic of China (Taiwan), Ambassador of the Republic of China to Japan, and Ambassador of the Republic of China to the United States (1956-1958). In the latter role, he was replaced by George Yeh.

Hollington K. Tong died on 9 January 1971, in a nursing home in Monterey, California, at the age of 83.

References
Chiang Kai Shek's Teacher and Ambassador -Hollington K. Tong 
 Dateline: China by Hollington K. Tong

Notes

Taiwanese journalists
1887 births
1971 deaths
Ambassadors of the Republic of China to the United States
University of Missouri alumni
Columbia University Graduate School of Journalism alumni
Writers from Ningbo
Politicians from Ningbo
Kuomintang politicians in Taiwan
Republic of China politicians from Zhejiang
Taiwanese people from Zhejiang
20th-century journalists